The 2010 IAAF Race Walking Challenge was the eighth edition of the annual international racewalking series organised by the International Association of Athletics Federations (IAAF). Ten meetings are scheduled for the competition: the 2010 IAAF World Race Walking Cup, four IAAF permit meetings, and five area permit meetings.

Athletes who have gained enough points from competing at these meetings will be entered into the IAAF Race Walking Challenge Final, where they will compete for a total pot of US $200,000 in prize money.

Calendar
The following ten meetings, as well as the competition final, form the schedule of the 2010 Race Walking Challenge. The "A" category meetings are worth the most points, with progressively fewer points being available through the "B" and "C" categories.

Winners

Challenge rankings

References

External links
Official homepage from IAAF
Past winners from GBR Athletics
Competition archive from IAAF
2010 challenge in review

Race Walking Challenge
World Athletics Race Walking Tour